Baryplegma forsteri is a species of tephritid or fruit flies in the genus Baryplegma of the family Tephritidae.

Distribution
Bolivia.

References

Tephritinae
Insects described in 1961
Diptera of South America